Pale Vidhan Sabha Constituency was one of the 40 Goa Legislative Assembly constituencies of the state of Goa in southern India. Pale was also one of the 20 constituencies falling under the North Goa Lok Sabha constituency.

Members of Legislative Assembly 
 1963: A. K. S. Usgaonkar, Maharashtrawadi Gomantak Party
 1967: A. K. S. Usgaonkar, Maharashtrawadi Gomantak Party
 1972: A. K. S. Usgaonkar, Maharashtrawadi Gomantak Party
 1977: Laxmikant Surlikar, Indian National Congress
 1980: Vishnu Naik, Maharashtrawadi Gomantak Party
 1984: Chandrakant Verenkar, Indian National Congress
 1989: Vinaykumar Usgaonkar, Maharashtrawadi Gomantak Party
 1994: Sadanand Malik, Maharashtrawadi Gomantak Party
 1999: Suresh Amonkar, Bharatiya Janata Party
 2002: Suresh Amonkar, Bharatiya Janata Party
 2007: Gurudas Gawas, Indian National Congress
 2007 (by election): Pratap Prabhakar Gauns , Indian National Congress

Election results

2007

See also
Sanquelim Assembly constituency

References

Former assembly constituencies of Goa
North Goa district